Angie is a 1994 American romantic comedy-drama film directed by Martha Coolidge, written by Todd Graff, and starring Geena Davis as the title character. It was produced by Caravan Pictures and distributed by Hollywood Pictures. It is based on the 1991 novel Angie, I Says by Avra Wing, which was a New York Times Notable Book of 1991. The film received mixed to negative reviews and was a box office bomb, grossing only $9.4 million against its $26 million budget.

Plot

Angie is an office worker who lives in the Bensonhurst section of Brooklyn, New York and dreams of a better life. After learning that she is pregnant by her boyfriend Vinnie, she decides that she will have the baby, but not Vinnie as a husband.

This turns the entire neighborhood upside down and starts her on a journey of self-discovery, including a love affair with a man named Noel who she meets at an art museum. Even her best friend Tina has trouble understanding her.

Cast
 Geena Davis as Angie
 James Gandolfini as Vinnie
 Stephen Rea as Noel
 Aida Turturro as Tina
 Leonard Spinelli as Tina's Son #2
 Philip Bosco as Frank
 Adam LeFevre as Museum Guard
 Jenny O'Hara as Kathy
 Margaret Cho as Admissions Nurse

Production
20th Century Fox films head Joe Roth, production president Roger Birnbaum and producer Larry Brezner had Angie, I Says under development. Todd Graff had written the screenplay for Madonna. The adaptation was placed into turnaround. Roth and Birnbaum had left for an independent label at Disney, Caravan Pictures, and were able to get the adaptation moved there from Fox. Because of scheduling conflicts with her role in Abel Ferrara's movie Dangerous Game, which is also produced by her company, Maverick, she dropped out of the then Jonathan Kaplan-directed film. Madonna had wanted them to push back production on the film, but given that it was a winter story, Caravan wanted to film it in winter, then debut it in winter. She bowed out as they also took issue with her lack of acting experience. The lead role was then offered to Geena Davis.

Reception

The film opened to mixed reviews and was a box office bomb. In addition, Geena Davis, who won an Oscar six years before for The Accidental Tourist received mixed to negative reviews. Critics felt she could have been better in this movie or another set in Brooklyn. The film was famous for introducing three actors who would star on the TV show The Sopranos: James Gandolfini, Aida Turturro, and Michael Rispoli. Audiences surveyed by CinemaScore gave the film a grade of "B" on scale of A+ to F.

Year-end lists
 Top 10 worst (listed alphabetically, not ranked) – Mike Mayo, The Roanoke Times

Awards
The movie was nominated an Artios for Best Casting for Feature Film, Comedy by the Casting Society of America.

References

External links

1994 films
1994 comedy films
1994 comedy-drama films
1994 drama films
1994 romantic comedy films
1990s American films
1990s English-language films
1990s pregnancy films
1990s romantic comedy-drama films
American pregnancy films
American romantic comedy-drama films
Caravan Pictures films
Films about mother–daughter relationships
Films based on American novels
Films directed by Martha Coolidge
Films scored by Jerry Goldsmith
Films set in Brooklyn
Hollywood Pictures films